Colegio Estilo is a private secular school in Madrid, Spain. It was founded in 1959 by Spanish writer Josefina Aldecoa, who was the Principal of Colegio Estilo for 52 years. The current Principal of Colegio Estilo is Susana Aldecoa. Colegio Estilo has today around 200 students and 30 teachers. It is a secular and artistic school, located in the area of El Viso, in Madrid, Spain.

History 
Colegio Estilo was founded by Josefina Aldecoa in October 1959 in Madrid, Spain. Colegio Estilo was born of the need for a free, modern, and pro-European school.

Located at calle Serrano 182, in El Viso neighborhood, the impending closure of the school was announced in June 2019.

Willy Toledo and Marcos de Quinto studied at the Colegio Estilo.

Philosophy 

Colegio Estilo follows the model laid out by the ILE (Free Institution of Teaching). Art is a core subject from the age of three and there is individual monitoring and follow-up of each student. 
Much of the classwork is carried out without text books and it is the children themselves who decorate their workbooks.

Subjects 
At Colegio Estilo, Language, Mathematics, Natural Sciences, History and Geography are taught in a creative way. It is the children themselves who craft their own books and notebooks. The students paint on easels, work with clay, fabrics, watercolors and all kinds of materials. Classical music often accompanies them as they work and create.

In general, students have five classes a week of English, three of Physical Education, two of Art, and one each of Music, Chess, Theatre, Creative Maths and Art History. In 5th and 6th grades children are introduced to French as a third language, as well as History of Religions.

Principals 
 Josefina Aldecoa (Principal of Colegio Estilo from 1959 until her death in 2011)
 Susana Aldecoa (Principal of Colegio Estilo since 2011). Before being the Principal, Susana Aldecoa was the Assistant Principal of Colegio Estilo for more than 30 years.

Fees 
 Pre-school: €489 / month
 1st and 2nd grades Primary school: €510 / month 
 3rd grade: €516 / month
 4th grade: €530 / month 
 5th and 6th grades: €572 / month
 Lunch and snacks provided by school: €180 / month
 Material: €300 / year

References

Bibliography 
Amelia Castilla. Memoria de un colegio : "Estilo", una experiencia de educación en libertad sobre la base de la comunidad. Madrid : Biblioteca Nueva, 2002.

María Jesús Álava Reyes & Susana Aldecoa. La Buena Educación. Enseñar con libertad y compromiso para convertir a los niños en adultos felices. Madrid: La esfera de los libros, 2003.

External links 
 Official website of Colegio Estilo
 Josefina Aldecoa, escritora y fundadora del Colegio Estilo: "Tengo 80 años y todos los días me levanto para ir al colegio" 
 Última clase de literatura y pedagogía. Fallece a los 85 años la escritora Josefina Aldecoa, fundadora del Colegio Estilo (El País, 17 de marzo de 2011)
 Anna Flotats. El refugio de Josefina Aldecoa. El Colegio Estilo de Madrid mantiene vivas las bases pedagógicas de la Institución Libre de Enseñanza (El País, 20 de febrero de 2011)

Schools in Madrid
Private schools in Spain
Art schools in Spain